Gray House may refer to:

Arts
The Gray House, a novel by Armenian Russian writer Mariam Petrosyan

Places in the United States
Alabama
Rev. John H. Gray House, Eutaw

Arkansas
Gray House (Crosby, Arkansas)
Gray-Kincaid House, Crosby
Walter Gray House, Melrose
Louis Gray Homestead, Barn, Plainview
Rufus Gray House, Pangburn

Colorado
Garret and Julia Gray Cottage, Salida, listed on the National Register of Historic Places in Chaffee County, Colorado

Georgia
Blackford-Gray House, Graysville, listed on the NRHP in Catoosa County, Georgia

Idaho
John P. and Stella Gray House, Coeur d'Alene

Illinois
William W. Gray House, Grayville

Kentucky
 Gray House (Shelbyville, Kentucky), listed on the NRHP in Shelby County, Kentucky

Maryland
Gray Gables (Darlington, Maryland)

Maine
Old Gray House, Boothbay

Massachusetts
David Gray House, Andover
Capt. Thomas Gray House, Barnstable
Asa Gray House Cambridge

Missouri
William Gray House, La Grange

Nevada
Joseph H. Gray House, Reno

New Jersey
De Gray House, Franklin Lakes

New York
Gray-Jewett House, Amsterdam
E. L. Gray House, Saranac Lake, in town of Harrietstown

North Carolina
Gray-Brownlow-Wilcox House, Brinkleyville
Bowman Gray House, known also as Rock House (Roaring Gap, North Carolina)
Gray Gables (Winton, North Carolina)

Ohio
Gray-Coulton House, Mentor, Ohio, listed on the NRHP in Lake County, Ohio
Adams-Gray House, Trinway, Ohio

Oregon
Capt. J. H. D. Gray House, Astoria, listed on the NRHP in Clatsop County, Oregon
Sprague-Marshall-Bowie House, Portland, also known as the G.T. Gray House

Pennsylvania
Gray-Taylor House, Brookville
Whitefield House and Gray Cottage, Nazareth
John Gray House (Port Matilda, Pennsylvania)

Tennessee
Benajah Gray Log House, Antioch
Henry P. Gray House, Franklin
Isaac Gray House, Winchester, listed on the NRHP in Franklin County, Tennessee

Texas
Gray Rental Houses, Belton, listed on the NRHP in Bell County, Texas

Utah
Levins D. Gray House, Park City

Virginia
Harry W. Gray House, Arlington

Washington
Dr. Paschal and Agnes Gray House, Ellensburg, listed on the NRHP in Kittitas County, Washington

See also
Grey House (disambiguation)